The 2007–08 UEFA Champions League group stage matches took place between 18 September and 12 December 2007.

Seeding and draw
Seeding was determined by the UEFA coefficients. The 32 teams were allocated into four pots based on their UEFA club coefficients at the beginning of the season, with the title holders being placed in Pot 1 automatically. They were drawn into eight groups of four containing one team from each of the four seeding pots, with the restriction that teams from the same national association could not be drawn against each other. Clubs from the same association were paired up to split the matchdays between Tuesday and Wednesday. For the nations with three or four clubs in the group stage, the following clubs were paired (so that the clubs from the same pair would play on different days): Milan and Internazionale, Roma and Lazio, Barcelona and Real Madrid, Valencia and Sevilla, Arsenal and Chelsea, Liverpool and Manchester United, Benfica and Sporting CP, Werder Bremen and Stuttgart. Additionally, winner of the qualifier between Sevilla and AEK Athens was paired with Olympiacos.

Notes

Tie-breaking criteria
Based on paragraph 6.05 in the UEFA regulations for the current season, if two or more teams are equal on points on completion of the group matches, the following criteria are applied to determine the rankings:
higher number of points obtained in the group matches played among the teams in question;
superior goal difference from the group matches played among the teams in question;
higher number of goals scored away from home in the group matches played among the teams in question;
superior goal difference from all group matches played;
higher number of goals scored in all group matches played;
higher number of coefficient points accumulated by the club in question, as well as its association, over the previous five seasons.

Groups
Times are CET/CEST, as listed by UEFA (local times are in parentheses).

Group A

Group B

Group C

Group D

Group E

Group F

Group G

Group H

Notes

References

 

Group Stage
UEFA Champions League group stages